David Gottlieb Yuengling (March 2, 1808 – September 27, 1877) was an American businessman and brewer, the founder and first president of America's oldest brewery, D. G. Yuengling & Son.

Early life
He was born David Gottlob Jüngling on March 2, 1808, in Aldingen near Stuttgart in the Kingdom of Württemberg, where his father operated the local brewery. His older brother Jakob inherited the family brewery, leaving Yuengling with limited career prospects. He emigrated to the United States via Rotterdam.

Career
Yuengling came to Pottsville, Pennsylvania, the location of a thriving anthracite mine, and started a brewery in 1829, calling it the Eagle Brewery. Yuengling brewed British-style ales initially, and later introduced German-style lager.

His son David G. Yuengling Jr. founded the James River Steam Brewery.

References

1808 births
1877 deaths
American brewers
American people of German descent
People from the Duchy of Württemberg
People from Pottsville, Pennsylvania
Yuengling family
19th-century American businesspeople